In competitive debate, an advantage is the way that the affirmative team refers to the positive consequences of adopting their position on the debate resolution. It is an argument structure that seeks to convince the judge that the affirmative plan, if adopted, would result in a net-beneficial improvement to the status quo.


Structure 
Some variance in the structure of an advantage exists.  The following are two of the most common structures:

Method 1
Uniqueness: An argument describing something in the status quo. Falls under the stock issue of inherency.
Impact: an argument explaining why that condition of the status quo is damaging. Falls under the stock issue of harms.
Solvency: an argument describing how the plan can alter the status quo to avoid the impact.

Method 2
Uniqueness: Claims about the status quo (typically undesirable or heading in a bad direction).
Link: An argument of how or why the plan causes something in the status quo to change.
Internal Link: How/why the link will result in a particular outcome.
Impact: The bad things avoided by passing the plan, or the good things that come to be.

See also 
 Disadvantage
 Policy debate
 Lincoln Douglas Debate

References

Debating
Public speaking